Dirck Dalens III (1688 – 1753), was a Dutch landscape painter.

Biography

He was born in Amsterdam as the son of Dirck II, who died before he was born. He was the pupil of Theodor van Pee, but left him to pursue a career in landscape painting like his father had done. He painted wall decorations for the owners of stately homes in the Netherlands. His best known works still exist in the city of leiden, these "gardenrooms" are now inhabited by students. His pupils were Jan ten Compe and Jan Ekels the Elder.
He died in Amsterdam and was buried in the Westerkerk.

References

Dirk Dalens III on Artnet

1688 births
1753 deaths
Dutch painters
Dutch male painters
Painters from Amsterdam